Several places, concepts, institutions, and things are namesakes of the English biologist Charles Darwin:

Places
Charles Darwin National Park
Charles Darwin Foundation
Charles Darwin Research Station
Charles Darwin School
Charles Darwin University
Darwin College, Cambridge
Darwin, Falkland Islands
Darwin, Northern Territory
Darwin Glacier (California)
Darwin Guyot, a seamount in the Pacific Ocean
Darwin Island, Galapagos Islands
Darwin Island (Antarctica)
Darwin Sound (Canada)
Darwin's Arch
Mount Darwin (Antarctica)
Mount Darwin (California)
Mount Darwin (Tasmania)

Things named after Darwin in relation to his Beagle voyage
Cordillera Darwin
Darwin's finches
Darwin's frog
Darwin's rhea
Darwin Sound
Mount Darwin (Andes)

Scientific names of organisms
Some 250 species and several higher groups bear Darwin's name; most are insects.
 Darwinilus, a rove beetle
 Darwinius, an extinct primate 
 Darwinopterus, a genus of pterosaur
 Darwinula, a genus of seed shrimp
 Darwinivelia, a water treader genus
 Darwinysius, a seed bug
 Darwinomya, a genus of flies
 Darwinella, a sponge genus
 Darwinsaurus, a dinosaur
 Darwinhydrus, a diving beetle
 darwini (multiple species)
 darwinii (multiple species)
 Minervarya charlesdarwini, a frog

Philosophies
Darwinism
Social Darwinism

Other
Darwin, a unit of evolutionary change
Darwin, an operating system
Darwin (ESA) (a proposed satellite system)
Darwin Awards
Darwin Medal
Darwin Prize
Darwin fish
Division of Darwin, a former electoral division in Australia
1991 Darwin,  a stony Florian asteroid
Darwin (lunar crater) a lunar crater
Darwin (Martian crater) a martian crater
Darwinia (plant), species named not after Charles Darwin but his grandfather Erasmus Darwin

See also
 Commemoration of Charles Darwin
 Darwin (disambiguation)
 List of organisms named after famous people

References

Charles Darwin
Darwin, Charles